Mario Valenzuela Osuna (born March 10, 1977) is a former professional baseball outfielder.

Career
Valenzuela played for the Chicago White Sox minor league affiliates, beginning in 1996 at the age of 19 by playing in the  Rookie League and eventually achieving Triple-A level in 2004.

In the Mexican Baseball League, Valenzuela played for the Saraperos de Saltillo (2005 - 2008), the Diablos Rojos del México (2009 - 2014), and the Guerreros de Oaxaca (2014 - 2017). 

In 2006, Valenzuela played for Team Mexico in the World Baseball Classic, finishing the tournament batting .250 with a home run and one run batted in.

For the 2009 World Baseball Classic edition, he joined Team Mexico as a replacement player for the injured Erubiel Durazo, going hitless in four at bats.

Valenzuela officially retired from professional baseball on January 26, 2018.

External links

Career statistics and player information from Baseball-Reference or MiLB.com 

1977 births
Living people
Algodoneros de Guasave players
Baseball players from Baja California Sur
Birmingham Barons players
Bristol White Sox players
Burlington Bees players
Charlotte Knights players
Diablos Rojos del México players
Great Falls White Sox players
Guerreros de Oaxaca players
Gulf Coast White Sox players
Mexican expatriate baseball players in the United States
Mexican League baseball left fielders
Mexican League baseball right fielders
Saraperos de Saltillo players
Winston-Salem Warthogs players
2006 World Baseball Classic players
2009 World Baseball Classic players
People from Mulegé Municipality